Rangwasa is a village near Rau, in Indore District, Madhya Pradesh, India. The village is situated on Rau Navda Road. The city of Indore is around 8 km away from the village, and Rau is 2 km away. The Raja Ramanna Centre for Advanced Technology (CAT) is attached to the village. Rangwasa farmers produce crops of potato, onion and soybean in a year. Two famous temples 'Umiya Dham' and 'Surya Mandir' are located near to this village.

Rangwasa hosts a mela (fair) celebrating the garba, a traditional dance form performed after Navratri .

Geography
Rangwasa is situated at an altitude of about 530 meters above sea level with a subtropical climate.

The summer daytime temperature can reach 45 °C with 20–25% humidity. Winter night temperatures can fall to 5–6 °C with 20–25% humidity.

Villages in Indore district